Juniperus durangensis is a species of conifer in the family Cupressaceae.

It is endemic to Mexico, in the states of Aguascalientes, Chihuahua, Durango, Jalisco, Sonora, Zacatecas.

References

 Current IUCN Red List of all Threatened Species

durangensis
Endemic flora of Mexico
Trees of Aguascalientes
Trees of Chihuahua (state)
Trees of Durango
Trees of Jalisco
Trees of Sonora
Trees of Zacatecas
Least concern flora of North America
Taxonomy articles created by Polbot
Flora of the Sierra Madre Occidental